Lisa Klein (born 15 July 1996) is a German professional racing cyclist, who currently rides for UCI Women's WorldTeam .

Major results

Road

2013
 National Junior Championships
2nd Road race
3rd Time trial
2014
 National Junior Championships
1st  Road race
1st  Time trial
 5th Road race, UCI World Junior Championships
2015
 4th Crescent Vargarda TTT
2016
 2nd Crescent Vargarda TTT
 3rd  Team time trial, UCI World Championships
 UEC European Under-23 Championships
3rd  Time trial
10th Road race
 8th Overall Tour de Feminin-O cenu Českého Švýcarska
2017
 National Championships
1st  Road race
4th Time trial
 1st Prologue Giro della Toscana
 2nd Crescent Vargarda TTT
 UEC European Under-23 Championships
3rd  Time trial
5th Road race
 4th Overall Healthy Ageing Tour
1st  Young rider classification
 4th Overall Festival Elsy Jacobs
1st  Young rider classification
 5th Overall Ladies Tour of Norway
1st  Young rider classification
2018
 1st  Team time trial, UCI World Championships
 2nd Overall BeNe Ladies Tour
1st  Young rider classification
 UEC European Under–23 Championships
2nd  Time trial
9th Road race
 3rd Time trial, National Championships
 3rd Gent–Wevelgem
 4th Ladies Tour of Norway TTT
 4th Crescent Vårgårda UCI Women's WorldTour TTT
 5th Overall Festival Elsy Jacobs
1st Prologue
 6th Overall Healthy Ageing Tour
1st  Young rider classification
2019
 1st  Time trial, National Championships
 1st  Overall BeNe Ladies Tour
1st Prologue & Stage 2b
 UEC European Championships
2nd  Team relay
2nd  Time trial
 2nd  Team relay, UCI World Championships
 2nd Nokere Koerse
2020
 1st  Team relay, UEC European Championships
2021
 1st  Team relay, UCI World Championships
 1st  Overall BeNe Ladies Tour
1st Stage 2b (ITT) 
 3rd Nokere Koerse
 6th Scheldeprijs
 6th Overall Healthy Ageing Tour
2022
 6th Overall Bloeizone Fryslân Tour

Track

2015
 2nd  Team pursuit, UEC European Under-23 Championships
2017
 2nd Scratch race, Six Days of Bremen
2018
 1st  Omnium, National Championships
2021
 1st  Team pursuit, Olympic Games

See also
 List of 2015 UCI Women's Teams and riders

References

External links
 

1996 births
Living people
German female cyclists
German track cyclists
Sportspeople from Saarbrücken
Cyclists at the 2020 Summer Olympics
Olympic cyclists of Germany
Medalists at the 2020 Summer Olympics
Olympic medalists in cycling
Olympic gold medalists for Germany
Cyclists from Saarland
21st-century German women
UCI Road World Champions (women)